Band of Gold is a British television crime drama series, written and created by Kay Mellor, first broadcast on ITV on 12 March 1995. Produced by Granada Television, the series revolves around the lives of a group of prostitutes who live and work in Bradford's red-light district. Principal actresses in the series include Geraldine James, Cathy Tyson, Barbara Dickson, and Samantha Morton. Three series of Band of Gold were produced (the third under the moniker of Gold, with only a small number of characters from the first two series), with the final episode broadcast on 1 December 1997.

Each series was released on VHS after its broadcast, followed by DVD reissues under the Cinema Club brand in July 2004. The complete series was released on DVD by Network on 6 February 2006, and was reissued on 22 May 2009. Prolific tie-in specialist John Burke novelised the first series' teleplays in Band of Gold: Ring of Lies (15 February 1996); and the second series' teleplays in Band of Gold: Chain of Power (9 May 1996); the publisher was Headline Books. A behind-the-scenes book, Gold: The Making of Band of Gold, written by Anthony Hayward, was published on 2 September 1997, to tie in with the broadcast of the third and final series.

Synopsis

Series 1
Gina Dickson (Ruth Gemmell) is a young mother living in Bradford, West Yorkshire who has thrown out her abusive husband, Steve, but finds herself in debt to numerous bill collectors. Gina goes to a loan shark named Mr. Moore to pay off her debts. But Gina can't find work, and there's no one to look after her three young daughters, while Mr. Moore wants his money back, with interest. She meets Carol (Cathy Tyson) since their children go to the same school and are friends. Carol currently works as a prostitute to support herself and her young daughter Emma. The desperate Gina tells Carol that she wants to join her profession to pay off her debts. Carol teaches Gina how to "work the Lane" and introduces Gina to the world of ponces, punters, and police. Gina also meets Carol's friends: Rose (Geraldine James), an older hooker who rules the lane, and Tracy (Samantha Morton), a 15-year-old runaway who's hooked on drugs supplied by her pimp. Anita Braithwaite (Barbara Dickson), is another friend who allows the women to rent out rooms in her flat in exchange for a cut of their earnings.

In the first episode, Carol accompanies Gina to a client's house. Whilst Gina is in another room with the client, Carol steals money from the client. Gina, putting her safety on the line, decides to work "The Lane" alone hoping to make up the last few pounds from one job so she can pay off her debts and go straight. Gina is later found murdered. Carol spends the rest of the series trying to avoid the serial killer, who proceeds to murder other prostitutes in Bradford. During the first series, Carol meets and becomes both intrigued and wary of a middle-aged client, named Curly (Richard Moore), who has a stocking fetish. Anita struggles to get by and her benefactor George Ferguson controls her. Tracy is attacked and nearly killed by her pimp Dez (Ashan Bhatti), but she recovers and her parents take her home. She is unable to stand living under their rules. Tracy's father abused her, she is not sure that her mother believes her, and her sister is resentful towards her for leaving home because her parents argued a lot since Tracy left. As a result, Tracy runs away from home again.
 
Tracy and Rose travel to London where Tracy continues her street-walking profession and Rose tries to go straight by going to college and meets a man, Richard, for whom she starts to have feelings. Tracy puts one of her calling cards in Richard's pocket; Richard phones and asks for two girls. Thinking that Rose will come with Tracy, he arranges to meet her. When Rose does not turn up, he leaves Tracey standing and visits Rose who comes clean to Richard (after they sleep together) about her life up North in Bradford and working the Lane. Rose can't understand when Richard rejects her as she liked him. She quits college and leaves town without Tracy, who is unwilling to go back up North as business is good in London. Rose then returns to Bradford.

In another subplot, Gina's murder sends shock waves through the community as her husband, Steve, is forced to help Gina's mother, Joyce, raise their three children as well as try to find a way to pay off her debts to the loan shark Mr. Moore.

DCI Newall, the police detective in charge of the murder investigation, is revealed to be having a tryst with Carol, who allows herself to be taken advantage of by the corrupt police officer in order to avoid being arrested for prostitution. She ends up suffering an emotional breakdown after pouring a kettle of hot water on Curly. Carol spends some time in a mental hospital and her daughter Emma is taken away from her. Upon her release, Carol sets off to try to find Gina's killer, and encounters many red herrings, from Curly, to Newall, to George Ferguson and Gina's husband, Steve.

In the final episode of the first series, Rose returns to Bradford to try to find another legitimate way to go straight. Tracy soon follows her, but still wants to keep her old profession. Carol finally comes face-to-face with the killer in a deserted community centre: he is revealed to be Ian, a psychotic community board member whom Carol and Gina briefly met in the first episode. He was the same client from whom Carol stole money. Fortunately Tracy raises the alarm and the other women, led by Curly, break into the building and the killer is subdued and arrested before he can kill Carol by drowning her in a swimming pool.

The first series ends on a somewhat upbeat note when Carol and Rose, still distraught over Gina's death, decide to quit prostitution and set up a legitimate cleaning company, with Anita and Gina's mother, Joyce, as silent partners, to rival that of the businessman, George Ferguson, for whom the loan shark, Mr Moore, was revealed to be working and who was responsible for Gina's harassment that led to her death.

Series 2
In the past several months in between the first and second series, Rose and Carol have turned their backs on prostitution and are trying to make a living by running their own cleaning company, "Scrubbit", with the financial support of Anita. But the women's old enemy, George Ferguson, is released from jail wanting revenge and needing a way to clear the debts he owes the local gangster Alf Black. Meanwhile, Tracy is still on the game and is in a sexual dalliance with Alf Black a dirty Old Man and most powerful crime lord on the streets, he  also supplies her drugs. But is just using as a pawn in a grander scheme to import lucrative drugs into the country. There's also a new prostitute on the streets, the emotionally damaged and dangerous S&M specialist Colette (Lena Headey).

In the beginning of the second series, Rose and Carol are still going straight and working for Scrubbit. Tracy is now living with Rose and using the house as a Brothel much to Rose's dismay. Tracy has befriended Colette, who Rose dislikes by saying to Tracy she is bad news as Colette is a drug user as is Tracy who is spiralling out of control. George Ferguson tries to seek revenge on the women since he owns part of Scrubbit as his estranged wife Kathleen backed the company for the woman so they could set it up, as Anita went and told Kathleen she had been having an affair with her husband George for years. Anita lies and tells George that the women are interested in having him involved they set up a meeting with him where they work and get George admitting on tape that he has still got financial wealth Anita tapes it and blackmails him and tells him to stay away or she will take the tape to the police.

The woman's celebrations are short lived when George runs Anita over with his car and snatches the tape from Anita's handbag. Earlier, Anita lets on about Colette's punter giving them advice about Scrubbit and George's intentions with the company. Rose knows that Tracy was letting Colette use the house as a Brothel and goes to confront Tracy the episode ends with Anita laid in the road as George drives off in his Jaguar. During this episode Tracy is introduced to Alf at a party, who smiles lecherously at her from afar, before engaging in sex with each other.

Series 2 contains the most graphic portrayal of prostitution and has Tracy perform in some explicit sex scenes. The main story arc of the sequel is based around Tracy as her drug addiction becomes worse and leads to psychosis.

Rose is the only member of the team who isn't fed up with running Scrubbit. Carol's old client, Curly (Richard Moore), has become more of a friend. Brenda (Margo Gunn) is a Klenzit employee who helps Ferguson in his attempt to sabotage Scrubbit. She is working for Scrubbit and going behind the women's backs to Ferguson telling him information about Scrubbit. However, Curly found dead in Carol's house with his throat cut. Rose suspects it was George Ferguson, but he too is later found murdered. Carol worries that the police will accuse her because she had a mental breakdown earlier on in series one and that Curly was one of her punters. She panics and disposes of his body with Rose's help, but police find the car the next day with Carol's fingerprints all over the car. Carol is arrested for Curly's murder.

Meanwhile, there's heartbreak for Rose when she thinks that cellist Sarah is her long-lost daughter. Rose tells Sarah that she thinks she is her daughter. Sarah gets upset and explains that she had a sister, named Hannah, a foster child who ran away when she was 12. Rose goes back to the house to speak to Sarah's mother only to find out Hannah went to a children's home in Sheffield after running away several times and tying Sarah to a chair and cutting all her hair off and stabbing her three times.

Later on, Rose finds out that Colette is her daughter. Sarah's family fostered Colette but she ran away after being violent towards Sarah who tells Rose what Colette did to her when they were children. Rose is shocked by the news.

Carol gets in the clear after the police discover Ferguson was killed in the same way as Curly. Vinnie is still pestering Carol and he kidnaps Emma after she comes back from swimming he rings Carol and tells her he's got Emma. Carol quickly goes to where Vinnie says he's holding Emma. DCI Newell saves Emma and Vinnie is arrested for this and questioned about the death of his uncle, Curly, which he denies killing him.

Meanwhile, Tracy is in deeper trouble with Alf Black. Rose is shocked when she discovers that her daughter is actually Colette. Carol re-evaluates her feelings for DCI Newall, who is now investigating these latest murders. Tracy's ex-pimp, Dez (who almost killed her in Series 1) is released from jail. Tracy enlists Colette's help in order to take her revenge against Dez, but Colette hadn't bargained for Tracy murdering him.

It was Tracy who murdered Curly in Carol's house when he comes round to visit her but Carol is not in as she had taken Emma to the park. Tracy also murders George Ferguson in cold blood while he is coming out of where he works in the car park. Tracy slits his throat and leaves him for dead. Anita hits him over the head with a crutch and knocks him out, she is later brought by the police as a suspect but is later released. Anita later realises that it was Tracy who murdered all three men and she is now a psychotic mass murderer.

Meanwhile, Joyce takes her grandchildren to Blackpool to see Steve who is now working there. They have a pleasant day at the seaside but things are soured when they both have too much to drink and sleep together, they both wake up the next day regretting what they have done as Steve was married to Joyce's dead daughter Gina who was murdered in series 1.

In the final episode, Colette asks for Rose's help to cover up Dez's murder when Tracy refuses to acknowledge what she has done in committing cold-blooded murder. Tracy's psychosis leads her in deeper with her demons when she goes back to Harrogate to her parents house and her father answers the door. Tracy murders her father when she is alone with him. Rose rings the house, Tracy answers, and after hearing Rose's voice, she unplugs the phone. Rose borrows a van and the girls go to Harrogate to rescue Tracy, but they get there too late as Tracy had already committed suicide upstairs in her mother and father's house. The scene ends with Tracy laid in her bed covered in blood after having stabbed herself.

At the end of series 2, sees the girls sitting at the pub where they were in the beginning of the first series but it's revealed that it's the day of Tracy's funeral and they are saying goodbye to her. Carol sees Curly's solicitor and discovers she has inherited his factory and all his wealth. The scene ends with Rose, Anita, Carol, Joyce, and Colette sadly toasting Tracy's life, and survival, and The Lane.

Series 3
Re-titled Gold, the third and final series is regarded as a spin-off or a sequel due to the series being heavily retooled. The series begins as Carol moves from the Ingram Estate to Curly's large house in an upmarket area. Carol is unwisely spending her inheritance money like water on everything now having newfound wealth and she doesn't know what to do with it. She goes to visit Colette in the house where she lived with Tracy, but she doesn't recognise Carol. Colette asks what Carol is doing there she explains that she has come to visit old friends.

Carol's inheritance is threatened when Curly's nephew, Vinnie, has hired a private detective to try to prove that Carol is still on the game as a prostitute. Meanwhile, Rose take on a cause to celebrate when a beautiful escort, named Paula, is implicated in two murders. After DCI Mace is killed, Paula disappears and Rose is asked to assist the police to find her. Rose finally locates Paula and takes her to Carol's house. The only person who can save Paula is murdered. Paula goes back home to her husband where he shoots her and them himself. Rose finds them both dead.

Also, a young transsexual prostitute named Sherrie is raped and Rose and Carol must ensure the victim gets justice by finding her assailant. In the final arc of the series, Rose takes on dangerous gangsters from Leeds and a confused but dangerous young prostitute (Alicya Eyo) as they control the lives of the girls on the lane.

Meanwhile, Carol accuses Vinnie of trying to take over Curly's factory and arranges for him to be dealt with. Rose continues to do good work in the community and on the tolerance zone all the girls are being targeted. Sherrie identifies the attacker as a magistrate that works with Rose. The worker, Ed Smithson, is stalking Sherrie when he breaks into her flat and threatens her with a razor. Sherrie is raped by Ed Smithson and afterwards she tells Rose about it. The police become involved and Sherrie then retracts her statement, when bribed by Ed. Rose accuses Smithson of blackmailing and bribing Sherrie. Rose loses her job and Inspector Henryson awards Rose by giving her job back and sacking Smithson as the sponsor and hiring someone else.

Carol's half sister, Lisa, turns up at her house because their mother is in hospital. Lisa ends up leaving after her and Carol had an argument and she called Carol a whore. Lisa leaves and is manipulated into working on the lane by Charlie, nicknamed Little Charlie for his false hope of running the lane.

The body of a murdered black woman is found and is identified as Marva. Raymond is questioned by the police. After he is released. he comes after Rose and attacks her with a gun.

In the final episode, Raymond kidnaps Rose, who tells her that Shaun killed Marva. Shaun is then killed and Carol and Rose realise that Charlie is the killer. Vinnie burns down the factory to get back at Carol and collect the insurance money, but he does not know that Carol, Rose, Emma, Lisa, and Charlie are still inside. They all manage to get out, except for Charlie, who perishes in the fire, as the series ends on this dramatic and tragic note.

Locations
"The lane" referred to in the production is a reference to "Lumb Lane" which is a real street in Manningham, Bradford, historically renowned for being an area in which many prostitutes work. In recent years, however, "The Lane" has fallen into disfavour among sex workers due to alleged intimidation by groups of local residents who have formed "clean-up" gangs. Part of the filming took place in the West End area of Ashton-under-Lyne.

Cast

Main
 Geraldine James as Rosemary "Rose" Garrity (Series 1—3)
 Cathy Tyson as Carol Johnson (Series 1—3)
 Barbara Dickson as Anita Braithwaite (Series 1—2)
 Samantha Morton as Naomi "Tracy" Richards (Series 1—2)
 Tony Doyle as George Ferguson (Series 1—2)
 David Schofield as DCI David Newhall (Series 1—2)
 Rachel Davies as Joyce Webster (Series 1—2)
 Richard Moore as Granville 'Curly' Dirken (Series 1—2)
 Ray Stevenson as Steve Dickson (Series 1—2)
 Fiona Allen as DI Erica Cooper (Series 3)

Supporting
 Ruth Gemmell as Gina Dixon (Series 1)
 Ace Bhatti as Dez (Series 1—2)
 Lena Headey as Colette (Series 2 - 3)
 Anthony Milner as Bob (Series 1)
 Adam Kotz as Vinnie Marshall (Series 1 & 3)
 Judy Browne as DS Kershaw (Series 1)
 Laura Kilgallon as Emma Johnson (Series 1—3)
 Stephen MacKenna as Ian (Series 1)
 Darren Tighe as Smiley (Series 2)
 Rebecca Callard as Tula (Series 2)
 Darren Warner as Lloyd (Series 3)
 Judy Brooke as Julie (Series 3)
 Danny Edwards as Sherrie Goodman (Series 3)
 Alicya Eyo as Jae (Series 3)
 Kern Falconer as Insp. Henryson (Series 3)
 Ifan Meredith as Little Charlie (Series 3)

Episodes

Series 1 (1995)
 Producer — Tony Dennis. Executive Producer — Sally Head. Broadcast — Sundays, 9:00pm.

Series 2 (1996)
 Producer — Elizabeth Bradley. Broadcast — Sundays, 9:00pm.

Series 3: Gold (1997)
 Producer — Gillian McNeill. Broadcast — Mondays, 9:00pm.

References

External links

1995 British television series debuts
1997 British television series endings
1990s British drama television series
English-language television shows
ITV television dramas
Prostitution in British television
Serial killers in television
Television shows produced by Granada Television
Television series by ITV Studios
Television shows shot in Bradford
Television shows set in Bradford
Television shows set in West Yorkshire